Konrad Friedrich Ludwig Beckhaus (18 August 1821, Lingen – 13 August 1890, Höxter) was a German Protestant clergyman and botanist.

He studied theology in Halle, Tübingen and Berlin, subsequently becoming a Hilfsprediger (curate) in the city of Höxter in 1847. In 1851 he became a pastor at Sankt Kiliani church in Höxter and six years later was appointed superintendent of the Paderborn church district.

He was the author of a popular book on the flora of Westphalia, titled Flora von Westfalen. die in der Provinz Westfalen wild wachsenden Gefäss-Pflanzen, published posthumously in 1893. Taxa with the specific epithet of beckhausii commemorate his name, as does the lichen genus Beckhausia.

References

1821 births
1890 deaths
People from Lingen
University of Halle alumni
Humboldt University of Berlin alumni
University of Tübingen alumni
German Protestant clergy
19th-century German botanists